Edward Steven Doyle (born 1959) was President of the United States Chess Federation from 1984 to 1987, the youngest person ever to be elected to that position. He is a chess tournament organizer, who is best known for organizing the annual U.S. Amateur Team East Championship which is held every February in Parsippany, New Jersey and is the biggest single-section tournament held in the US.

Steve also served for twenty years as an officer of the New Jersey State Chess Federation. He is Past President. 

In addition, Steve authored a weekly chess column for the Newark Star Ledger for thirty years. 

From 1996 to 2006 he was Vice President of FIDE. He is the only living American to be an Honorary Member of FIDE. 

In the non chess world he holds an MBA and has been a senior officer at two fortune 50 companies. From Chief Financial Officer to President of a major division at both Prudential and Aetna. 

Steve also is very Philanthropic and serves on many charitable boards from the Island Heights Sailing Foundation to the Peto Museum. He supports the visual and performing arts throughout New Jersey and New York City. 

He was the founding President of the US Chess Hall of Fame and Museum located in St Louis.

External links 
 
 

1959 births
Living people
American chess players
Chess officials